The R103 road is a regional road in north Dublin, Ireland, passing through Finglas, between Ballymun and Glasnevin, then passing Donnycarney before reaching Killester at the Howth Road.  A major stretch of the road forms Collins Avenue.

The official description of the R103 from the Roads Act 1993 (Classification of Regional Roads) Order 2012 reads:

R103 Finglas - Killester, Dublin

Between its junction with R102 at Tolka Valley Road and its junction with R105 at Howth Road via Cardiffsbridge Road, Mellowes Road, Seamus Ennis Road, Ballygall Road West, Glasnevin Avenue, Collins Avenue Extension, Collins Avenue West, Collins Avenue and Collins Avenue East all in the city of Dublin.

See also
Roads in Ireland
National primary road
National secondary road
Regional road

References

Regional roads in the Republic of Ireland
Roads in County Dublin
Roads in Dublin (city)